The Congressional Union for Woman Suffrage was an American organization formed in 1913 led by Alice Paul and Lucy Burns to campaign for a constitutional amendment guaranteeing women's suffrage. It was inspired by the United Kingdom's suffragette movement, which Paul and Burns had taken part in. Their continuous campaigning drew attention from congressmen, and in 1914 they were successful in forcing the amendment onto the floor for the first time in decades.

Early history
Alice Paul created the Congressional Union (CU) after joining the National American Woman Suffrage Association (NAWSA) and gaining leadership of its Congressional Committee. 
The CU was initiated to assist the NAWSA Congressional Committee and its officers were part of that committee. 
The CU shared the same goal with NAWSA, to gain an amendment to the United States Constitution giving all women the right to vote. In the beginning, the CU worked within NAWSA to strengthen the declining Congressional Committee. In March 1913, after realizing the amount of work to be done, the CU became in charge of their own operations and funding but still remained affiliated with NAWSA. In the fall of 1913, Carrie Chapman Catt of NAWSA accused the CU of insubordination and financial irregularities, allegations which she later retracted. The strategies of the two organizations were conflicting and NAWSA's leadership felt threatened. In December 1913, the National American Woman Suffrage Association selected a new Congressional Committee and formally cut ties with the Congressional Union.

Initiative 
The Congressional Union for Woman Suffrage appealed to young women with a new approach in the fight for women's suffrage, inspired by the British suffragettes. 
Alice Paul believed women should not have to beg for their rights. Paul introduced some of the militant methods used by the Women's Social and Political Union in Britain to the CU and its members. These included direct actions, organizing huge demonstrations, and the daily picketing of the White House. The CU had 4,500 members and had raised more than $50,000 in funds by 1914. Over time, the efforts of hundreds of members led to their arrest and sometimes imprisonment.

Organization 
The Congressional Union's headquarters were located on F Street in Washington, D.C., near the Willard Hotel in a highly visible office which they paid for themselves. They started women's "suffrage schools" to spread awareness about their cause and held multiple meetings each day. The CU was never organized by states or districts, but there were different branches of the organization in a number of states. The Washington headquarters was central to their work but they were also a mobile organization. The CU published a newspaper called The Suffragist, featuring articles by prominent members including Alice Paul, Lucy Burns and Inez Milholland. The newspaper employed Nina Allender as its main cartoonist, and also published cartoons by artists such as Cornelia Barns, Boardman Robinson and Marietta Andrews.

Campaigning 
The Congressional Union actively campaigned for a constitutional amendment guaranteeing universal woman suffrage. Following the methods used by suffragettes in Britain, the CU fully blamed the majority party for failure to advance the Federal Suffrage Amendment. The majority party at the time was the Democratic Party, and Democrat Woodrow Wilson was president. Members traveled west and campaigned against Democrats in hopes of impeding their reelection. They even campaigned against Democrats who approved women's suffrage, despite criticism from the National American Woman Suffrage Association. They traveled through the west by train while using a number of tactics to increase their visibility and their whistle-stop speeches attracted the attention of reporters. Their campaign resulted in the defeat of 20 Democrats who supported suffrage, much to the dismay of NAWSA.

National Woman's Party 

The Congressional Union created the National Woman's Party at a meeting in Chicago in 1916. The party included members of the Congressional Union, and Alice Paul was in charge. A Campaign Committee was formed within the party with Anne Martin serving as chairman. In 1917, the two organizations officially joined to form the National Woman's Party (NWP) and elected Alice Paul as their chairman. After the ratification of the 19th Amendment, the National Woman's Party launched a long campaign to secure the passage of the Equal Rights Amendment.

Congressional Union for the Equal Rights Amendment 
In 1981, a group of women including Mary Ann Beall and notable feminist Sonia Johnson formed an organization they called Congressional Union in New York City to continue to struggle for the ERA. The women were inspired by the suffragists as Johnson noted in her book, Going Our of Our Minds: The Metaphysics of Liberation, "...we called ourselves the Congressional Union, taking the name and philosophy from the women's suffrage group created in 1914 by Alice Paul and Lucy Burns..." At the end of June in 1982, the Congressional Union organized a "ritual of mourning" as well as a "celebration of rebirth" for the ERA at the National Archives.

This organization later splitered off and a group of women including Johnson formed a new feminist organization known as A Group of Women."

Notable members

See also
List of suffragists and suffragettes
Timeline of women's suffrage
Women's suffrage organizations

References

External links

The Suffragist at Internet Archive
Congressional Union for Woman Suffrage newsletter collection - University of Maryland Libraries

Women's suffrage advocacy groups in the United States
Feminist political parties in the United States
Progressive Era in the United States
Alice Paul
National Woman's Party
Militant feminism
Equal Rights Amendment organizations